
Whistling Woods International is a film, communication and creative arts institute located in Mumbai, India. The institute is promoted by the Indian Filmmaker Subhash Ghai, Mukta Arts and Film City Mumbai. In July 2014, The Hollywood Reporter named Whistling Woods International on its list of "The best film schools in the world". The school was first ranked among the top 10 film schools by The Hollywood Reporter in 2010.

Programmes offered at Whistling Woods International vary in duration from 1 year to 4 years. All the major specialisations of the Media, Communication & Creative industry are catered to in the seven schools housed at Whistling Woods International, namely, School of Filmmaking, Actors' Studio, School of Animation, School of Design, School of Fashion, School of Media & Communication and School of Music.

Whistling Woods International has affiliated with 2 universities to offer 2, 3 & 4-yr graduate and postgraduate programs. They are the Tata Institute of Social Sciences and Rajiv Gandhi National Institute for Youth Development

References

External links
 Official website

Universities and colleges in Mumbai
Educational institutions established in 2006
Film schools in India
Animation schools in India
Fashion schools in India
Design schools
2006 establishments in Maharashtra